For primary schools named "Cambridge" see: Cambridge Elementary School (disambiguation)

The Cambridge Public School District or Cambridge Public Schools is a school district serving Cambridge, Massachusetts in Greater Boston, in the United States. The mission of the school district is "Cambridge Public Schools delivers an excellent education that inspires,
acknowledges, empowers, and supports every student on their personal journey to achieve their highest potential in and beyond school and as productive members of their communities."

History

In 2003, the Cambridge Rindge and Latin School (CRLS), also known as Rindge School, came close to losing its educational accreditation when it was placed on probation by the New England Association of Schools and Colleges. The school has improved under Principal Chris Saheed; graduation rates hover around 98%, and 70% of students gain college admission.

In 2006 James Conry, the district's chief financial officer said that the district had a projected $4.9 million surplus due to a high state reimbursement from the Circuit Breaker program.

Schools
The district, as of 2022, has twelve elementary schools, with ten schools with grade levels JK-5, one English-Spanish dual immersion school with grades JK-8, and a Montessori school serving age 3 to grade 5. It has four upper schools and one full high school program.

High schools

 Cambridge Rindge & Latin School
 Career & Technical Education/Rindge School of Technical Arts (RSTA)
 High School Extension Program

K-8 schools
Amigos School

Upper schools
Cambridge Street Upper School
Putnam Avenue Upper School
Rindge Avenue Upper School
Vassal Lane Upper School

Elementary schools
Baldwin
Cambridgeport
Dr. Martin Luther King, Jr.
Fletcher-Maynard Academy
Graham & Parks Alternative Public School
Haggerty
Kennedy-Longfellow School
King Open
Morse School
Peabody
Tobin Montessori

References

Further reading
Abebe, Rediet T. "School District Discusses Budget." The Harvard Crimson. December 2, 2009.
Harmer-Dionne, Elizabeth. "City's schools fail middle class." (letter to the editor) Boston Globe. April 30, 2006.

External links

 Cambridge Public School District

Education in Cambridge, Massachusetts
Government of Cambridge, Massachusetts
School districts in Massachusetts